Tour of Iran (Azerbaijan) 2019 is a UCI 2.1 Asian Tour and the 34th edition of Tour of Iran (Azerbaijan). It was held in five stages in October 2019 in Iranian Azerbaijan. The race started in the city of Tabriz and went through Urmia, Jolfa, and Sarein ending at the Sahand Ski Resort.

Stages

Final standing

References

2019
2019 UCI Asia Tour
2019 in Iranian sport
October 2019 sports events in Asia
October 2019 events in Iran